Clothier may refer to:

Professions
 Someone involved in the making and marketing of cloth, see cloth production
Tailor, the most common modern usage
Cloth merchant
Clothing store

Surname
Cecil Clothier (1919–2010), English judge
Henry William Clothier (1872–1938), British electrical engineer and inventor
Hurshul Clothier (1922–2006), American western swing band musician and bandleader
Robert Clothier (1921–1999), Canadian stage and television actor
Robert Clarkson Clothier (1885–1970), president of Rutgers University 1932–1951 and president of the New Jersey Constitutional Convention of 1947
William Clothier (tennis) (1881–1962), American tennis player
William Clothier (cinematographer) (1903–1996), American film director of photography

See also
Clothier, West Virginia, an unincorporated community
Strawbridge & Clothier, American department store, subsequently known as Strawbridge's